John Morris (England 1963) is an Australian sculptor.

Born in England, his family moved to Australia in 1966. After the Diploma of Arts (1983) at Queensland College of Graphic Design he started working as freelance illustrator. In the following years he approached the art of sculpting with polyester resin and wax technique. Later he started sculpting in bronze. His first sculpture made with this metal appeared in 1990. Morris turned to wood sculpting in 1996.
“The works of John Morris spring from exhaustive sketching and illustration, drawing on intensive research”

Exhibitions

1992 - Tres Mode - Fine Art Gallery - Toowong, QLD, Australia
1994 -1996 - Represented by Cintra Gallery - Milton, QLD, Australia
1995 -2001 - Represented by Pages Fine Art Galleries - Noosa Heads & Montville, QLD, *Australia 1996 - First Sculpture In Wood
1996 -1999 - Represented by Contemporary Art & Design Gallery - Woolloongabba, QLD, Australia
1996 - Solo Exhibition
1996 - ‘Dogs’ - Group Exhibition ‘
1998 - ‘Flight’ - Group Exhibition 
1999 - Two Man Exhibition
1999 -2000 - Represented by Gallerie De L‘ Art Erotic - New Farm, QLD, Australia
2001 - Fox Galleries - Two Man Exhibition - New Farm, QLD, Australia
2001 - Contemporary Art & Design Gallery at Heritage Winery - Group Exhibition - Mt Tamborine, QLD
2001–Present - Represented by Form (formerly Craftwest) - Perth, WA, Australia
2002 - ‘Surface + Form’ - International Group Exhibition 
2002 - Solo Exhibition
2002 - ‘Crate Expectations’ - Tweed Wood Biennially - Curated Group Exhibition - Tweed River Art Gallery - Murwillumbah, NSW, Australia
2002 - Space Furniture - Group Exhibition - New Farm, QLD, Australia
2002 - Australia - Korea Foundation, 10th Anniversary Group Exhibition in association with Craftwest - Mukkumoto Craftspace - Seoul, Korea
2004 - ‘Nature Transformed’ - Touring Group Exhibition - University of Michigan Museum of Art, - Michigan, USA 2004 - Represented by Richard Martin Gallery, NSW, Australia
2004 - Represented by Maria Perides Gallery - Brisbane, QLD, Australia
2004 - Group Exhibition
2004 - ‘Re:Cycle’ - Tweed Wood Biennial - Tweed River Art Gallery - Murwillumbah, NSW, Australia
2005 - ‘Nature Transformed’ - Touring Group Exhibition - Mobile Museum of Art - Alabama, USA
2005 - ‘Shoe Fetish’ - Group Exhibition - Marks & Gardner Gallery - Mt Tamborine, QLD, Australia
2005 - 2006 - Represented by the Art Directors Gallery - Fortitude Valley, QLD, Australia
2005 - 2006, 2007 - Cerebral Palsy League - ‘Art for Art's Sake’ - Group Exhibition, Charity Auctions
2006 - ‘Feline Forms’ - Group Exhibition - Marks & Gardner Gallery - Mt Tamborine, QLD, Australia
2006 - ‘Nature Transformed’ - Touring Group Exhibition - Museum of Arts and Design - New York, USA
2006 - Kiln - Inaugural Group Exhibition - The Substation - Paddington, QLD, Australia
2007 - ‘The Shape of Things’ - Group Exhibition - Bungendore Woodwork Gallery - Bungendore, NSW, Australia
2007 - ‘2 Man Exhibition’ - Marks & Gardner Gallery - Mt Tamborine, QLD, Australia
2007 - ‘Shy Boy, She Devil and Isis’ - The Art of Conceptual Craft, Selections from the Wornick Collection - Museum of Fine Arts Boston, USA
2008 - 'Sculpture 08' - Marks & Gardner Gallery - Mt Tamborine, QLD, Australia
2009 - ‘2D + 3D’ - 2 Man Exhibition - White Hill Gallery & Sculpture Park - Red Hill, Vic, Australia
2009 - John Morris Sculptures and Prints - Solo Exhibition - Bungendore Woodworks Gallery, NSW, Australia
2010 - ‘Forms of Attachment’ - Sculpture Exhibition - Meyer Gallery - Sydney, NSW, Australia
2010 - ‘Absence of Reason’ - Print Exhibition - Meyer Gallery - Sydney, NSW, Australia 2010 - Represented by Red Sea Gallery- Fortitude Valley, QLD, Australia
2011 Represented by Red Sea Gallery, New Farm, QLD, Australia
2012 Solo Exhibition- Lethbridge Gallery, Brisbane, QLD, Australia

Summer Group Show- Lethbridge Gallery, Brisbane, QLD, Australia

‘Small Works’ Group Exhibition- Marks & Gardner Gallery, Mt Tamborine, QLD, Australia

‘Beyond Containment’ Invitational Group Exhibition- AAW Gallery of Wood Art, St. Paul, Minnesota & San Jose, California, USA

Deakin University Contemporary Small Sculpture Award 2012- Deakin University Gallery, 
Burwood, VIC, Australia
2011 Represented by Red Sea Gallery, New Farm, QLD, Australia
2013 ‘Curiouser’-Solo Exhibition- Lethbridge Gallery, Brisbane, QLD, Australia
‘Next’ Group Exhibition- Bungendore Wood Works Gallery, Bungendore, NSW, Australia
‘Harmony’ Invitational Group Exhibition- AAW Gallery of Wood Art, St. Paul, Minnesota, USA
Deakin University Contemporary Small Sculpture Award 2013- Deakin University Gallery,Burwood, VIC, Australia
2014 ‘Lethbridge Gallery Artist Showcase’- Lethbridge Gallery, Brisbane, QLD, Australia
‘Eye of the Beholder’ Solo Exhibition- Lethbridge Gallery, Brisbane, QLD, Australia
2015 ‘Art Basel Miami’, Miami Beach, Florida, USA
‘San Diego Contemporary Art Show’, Balboa Park, San Diego, USA
‘Audacious: The Fine Art of Wood from the Montalto Bohlen Collection’- Peabody Essex 
Museum, Salem, Massachusetts, USA
‘Lethbridge Gallery Artist Showcase’- Lethbridge Gallery, Brisbane, QLD, Australia
‘Figments, Fragments and Fixations’ Solo Exhibition- Lethbridge Gallery, Brisbane, QLD, Australia
‘Clayton Utz Art Award’, Clayton Utz, Brisbane, QLD, Australia
Group Exhibition- Lethbridge Gallery, Brisbane, QLD, Australia
2016 ‘Edge of Reality’ Solo exhibition- Lethbridge Gallery, Brisbane, QLD, Australia
2018 ’Showtime’ Solo exhibition- Lethbridge Gallery, Brisbane, QLD, Australia

Collections

Tweed River Art Gallery - 
Murwillumbah - NSW, Australia
Bovis Australia
Dixon Johnston Property
Collections in Queensland 
New South Wales 
Victoria and Western Australia 
USA 
Europe 
Japan 
South Africa 
New Zealand and Thailand

References

Living people
1963 births
Australian sculptors
Artists from Queensland